The Tenza Valley (Spanish: Valle de Tenza) is an intermontane valley in the Eastern Ranges of the Colombian Andes. The valley stretches over the southeastern part of the department of Boyacá and the northeastern part of Cundinamarca. It is located east of the Altiplano Cundiboyacense and in the time before the Spanish conquest of the Muisca, as the Altiplano was inhabited by the Muisca in the higher altitudes and the Tegua in the lower areas to the east.

Etymology 
The Tenza Valley is named after Tenza which means in Chibcha: "Behind the mouth" or "Going down at night".

Geography and geology 
The Lengupá River, part of the Orinoco drainage basin, flows through the valley and connects the higher altitude Altiplano Cundiboyacense with the Llanos Orientales. The Une, Villeta, Socha, Macanal and Bogotá Formations outcrop in the valley. The valley is rich in water.

History 
The Tenza Valley was inhabited by the Muisca before conquistador Gonzalo Jiménez de Quesada entered the central highlands of Colombia. The Tenza Valley was ruled by a cacique who was loyal to the zaque based in Hunza, present-day Tunja. On the fertile lands of the valley the indigenous people elaborated their agriculture. The valley was also important in the economy of the Muisca, hosting the important emerald resources of Chivor and Somondoco.

Archaeologist Juanita Sáenz Samper has discovered three agricultural terraces and five cemeteries hosting one grave and pertaining to pre-Columbian times. The research in the Tenza Valley has also uncovered typical grey ceramics of the area, called Valle de Tenza Gris.

Modern times 
The Chivor Reservoir, producing 8% of Colombia's hydroelectric energy, is located in the Tenza Valley. Despite the pleasant climate compared to the colder regions of Boyacá, the Tenza Valley is not touristic.

Economy 
The temperate climate of the Tenza Valley allows for a variety in agriculture. Main products cultivated are maize, yuca, potatoes, papa criolla, sugarcane, tomatoes, bananas, coffee, fique, arracacha, peas, beans, cucumbers, pumpkins, mangoes, chirimoya, oranges, avocadoes, pineapples, mandarines, papayas, maracuyá, guayaba and lulo.

In terms of mining, the emerald mines of Chivor and Somondoco are important. Coal mines and gold extraction form another part of the mining business in the valley. Salt is mined on a minor scale in Sutatenza and gypsum is exploited in Macanal.

Municipalities in the Tenza Valley

See also 

 Eastern Hills
 Muisca
 Altiplano Cundiboyacense, Bogotá savanna, Tegua, Colombian emeralds

References

Further reading

External links 
  Cycling route in the Tenza Valley
  Video of the Tenza Valley

Valleys of Colombia
Geography of Boyacá Department
Geography of Cundinamarca Department
Muisca